5-a-side football at the 2019 Parapan American Games were held in Villa Maria del Triunfo Hockey centre, Lima from August 24–30, 2019. There was 1 gold medals in this sport.

Medal summary

Medal table

Medalists

Results

Group stage

Finals

Bronze medal match

Gold medal match

References

External links
 Football 5

2019 Parapan American Games